Solomon (Shloyme) Mikhoels ( [also spelled שלוימע מיכאעלס during the Soviet era],  – 13 January 1948) was a Latvian born Soviet Jewish actor and the artistic director of the Moscow State Jewish Theater. Mikhoels served as the chairman of the Jewish Anti-Fascist Committee during World War II. However, as Joseph Stalin pursued an increasingly anti-Jewish line after the War, Mikhoels's position as a leader of the Jewish community led to increasing persecution from the Soviet state. He was assassinated in Minsk in 1948 by order of Stalin.

Early life
Born Shloyme Vovsi in Dvinsk (now Daugavpils, Latvia), Mikhoels studied law in Saint Petersburg, but left school in 1918 to join Alexis Granowsky's Jewish Theater Workshop, which was attempting to create a national Jewish theater in Russia in Yiddish. The workshop moved to Moscow in 1920, where it established the Moscow State Jewish Theater. That was in keeping with Vladimir Lenin's policy on nationalities, which encouraged them to pursue and to develop their own cultures under the aegis of the Soviet state.

Theatrical career
Mikhoels was the company's leading actor and, as of 1928, its director. His memorable roles included Tevye in an adaptation of Sholom Aleichem's novel Tevye the Milkman (which was adapted for an American audience as Fiddler on the Roof) and the title role in a Yiddish translation of Shakespeare's King Lear, in 1935. As a director he commissioned a new Bar Kochba, written by Shmuel Halkin, which the company successfully staged as a socialist turn on the traditional story.

These plays were ostensibly supportive of the Soviet state; however, the historian Jeffrey Veidlinger has argued that closer readings suggest that they actually contained veiled critiques of Joseph Stalin's regime and assertions of Jewish national identity. It is now believed  that the Ukrainian director Les Kurbas contributed to the original King Lear production after he was ousted from his Berezil Theater in 1934. He seems to have had a lasting influence on Mikhoel's directing style.

Antifascist activities
By the mid-1930s, Mikhoels's career was threatened because of his association with other leading intelligentsia members who were victims of Stalin's Great Purge.

On August 24, 1941, Mikhoels led a gathering of thousands in central Moscow's Gorky Park. It was explicitly a Jewish rally and aimed to raise funds for the Soviet war effort from the international Jewish community. Speakers included the writer David Bergelson.

Mikhoels actively supported Stalin against Adolf Hitler and, in 1942, was made the chairman of the Jewish Anti-Fascist Committee. In that capacity, he travelled around the world and met with Jewish communities to encourage them to support the Soviet Union in its war against Nazi Germany.

That was useful to Stalin during World War II, but after the war, Stalin opposed contacts between Soviet Jews and Jewish communities in noncommunist countries, particularly Mikhoels' aims of establishing Jewish autonomy in Crimea, which he regarded as a plot by American capitalists. The Jewish State Theater was closed, and the members of the Jewish Anti-Fascist Committee were arrested. All but two were eventually executed in the purges shortly before Stalin's death.

Death
On the morning of 13 January 1948, workmen discovered Mikhoels's dead body lying in snow in a quiet street in Minsk. The theatre critic, Vladimir Golubov-Potapov was lying dead beside him. It was announced that they had been killed in a traffic accident. Mikhoels's body lay in state for a day in the Jewish National Theatre. He was praised in a Pravda obituary and accorded a state funeral, with prominent members of the party and government officials among the mourners. His daughter, Natalya, and her husband Moisei Weinberg hosted a stream of mourners at their flat, including the composer Dmitri Shostakovich. He was buried at the New Donskoy Cemetery, in Moscow.

Even at the time, many people suspected that his death was not an accident, including the Yiddish poet Peretz Markish, who hinted in a poem that Mikhoels's name should be added to the six million victims of The Holocaust. Stalin's daughter, Svetlana Alliluyeva later wrote that:

After Stalin's death in March 1953, Lavrentiy Beria regained control of the Ministry for State Security (MGB), which he had temporarily lost, and on 2 April, he informed the party praesidium that Mikhoels  and Golubov had been murdered. The men he accused of the murders, the Deputy Minister of State Security Sergei Ogoltsov and Minister of State Security for the Belorussian republic, Lavrentiy Tsanava were arrested. When ut Beria was himself arrested, in June, Ogoltsov's wife and Tsanava pleaded for the case to be overturned. Ogoltsov was released, though Tsanava died in prison.

According the former MGB officer, Pavel Sudoplatov, who was assigned in 1953 to investigate the murder, Mikhoels was lured to Tsanava's country dacha, ostensibly to meet some of Belarus's leading dramatic artists, and was stabbed with a poison needle by an MGB officer named Lebedev, with Tsanava and Ogoltsov supervising the operation. Golubov was an MGB informer, who was killed because he was an "inconvenient witness".

Family

Mikhoels was married to Anastasia Pototskaya, a Russian of Polish descent. He had two daughters from his first marriage to Sara Kantor, Nina and Natalya Vovsi.

Mikhoels' cousin Miron Vovsi was a famous physician. He was arrested during the Doctors' plot affair but released after Stalin's death in 1953, as was Mikhoels' son-in-law, the Polish-born composer Mieczysław Weinberg. In 1983, Mikhoels' daughter, Natalia Vovsi-Mikoels, wrote a biography of her father: My Father Shlomo Mikhoels: The Life and Death of a Jewish Actor.

Other posts
 Jewish Theater School Artistic Director, Professor
 Member of Moscow City Council
 Member of the Stalin Prize Committee

Ranks and awards
 Order of Lenin
 People's Artist of the USSR
 Stalin Prize Laureate

References

External links
 Mikhoels, Solomon yivoencyclopedia.org
 
 
 Виктор Левашов. Убийство Михоэлса at lib.ru
 Video Lecture on Solomon Mikhoels by Dr. Henry Abramson of Touro College South

1890 births
1948 deaths
Actors from Daugavpils
People from Dvinsky Uyezd
Latvian Jews
Jewish male actors
People's Artists of the USSR
Soviet theatre directors
Soviet Jews
Jewish socialists
Jewish anti-fascists
Jews executed by the Soviet Union
Yiddish theatre performers
Stalin Prize winners
People murdered in the Soviet Union
Soviet male stage actors
People killed in Soviet intelligence operations
Burials at Donskoye Cemetery